Jorge Luis Alfaro Quiñones (born 10 June 1962) is a Cuban high jumper.

He made his mark with two medals in the u-17 class at the 1978 Central American and Caribbean Junior Championships. He later won the gold medal at the 1979 Central American and Caribbean Championships, the bronze medal at the 1981 Central American and Caribbean Championships, the gold medal at the 1983 Central American and Caribbean Championships, the gold medal at the 1983 Ibero-American Championships and the bronze medal at the 1983 Pan American Games.

References

1962 births
Living people
Cuban male high jumpers
Athletes (track and field) at the 1983 Pan American Games
Pan American Games bronze medalists for Cuba
Pan American Games medalists in athletics (track and field)
Medalists at the 1983 Pan American Games
20th-century Cuban people